Fawad Ali (born 12 November 1986) is a Pakistani first-class cricketer who played for Peshawar cricket team.

References

External links
 

1986 births
Living people
Pakistani cricketers
Peshawar cricketers
Cricketers from Peshawar